Vietnam made its Paralympic Games debut at the 2000 Summer Paralympics in Sydney, with just two competitors: Nguyen Thi Xuan Anh in the women's 800m sprint (T54 category) in athletics, and Truong Cong Hung in the men's up to 52 kg category in powerlifting. The country's delegation in 2004 was slightly larger, and entirely composed of women, with a female sprinter, two female powerlifters and a female swimmer. In 2012, Vietnam fielded its largest delegation to date, with eleven athletes across three sports: track and field, powerlifting and swimming.

Vietnam has never taken part in the Winter Paralympics. The country has won one gold medal,two silver medals and two bronze medals.

Summer Paralympic Games

Medals by Games

Medals by sport

Medals by individual

See also
 Vietnam at the Olympics

References

 
Paralympics